Giuseppe Fiorini (1861–1934) was an Italian luthier and is considered one of the most important Italian violin makers. He built his first instrument at the age of 16  while working in Bologna.  He established Rieger and Fiorini in Germany from 1888, then lived in Zurich during World War 1 and Rome from 1923.

He donated the workshop tools, templates and drawings of Stradivarius to the City of Cremona. 

He was honoured with a knighthood (Cavaliere) in 1927.

Early life and education

Fiorini was born at Bazzano, Emilia-Romagna, the son and pupil of influential violin maker - Raffaele Fiorini. He built his first instrument at the age of 16 and worked in Bologna, from 1877 to 1888.

Career

Bologna
Fiorini worked in Bologna, from 1877 to 1888. He ran his own violin studio in 'via Santo Stefano', and obtained mentions at various exhibitions. He won a prize at the Milano Exhibition of 1888, and the same year received the 'Gran medaglia d'oro' at the International Music Exhibition of Bologna.

Germany
In 1888, having married the daughter of Andreas Rieger, musical instrument maker, he moved to Munich and established the firm "Rieger and Fiorini" (1889–1914). He established himself in Germany, such that he was a founder of the German Violin-Makers' Society, and served as President for several years.

Switzerland
From 1915 until 1923 he lived and worked in Zurich,

Rome
In 1923 he settled in Rome. From 1925 his sight started to fail.

Reputation
By 1926 Fiorini had built 500 violins, 10 violas, and 10 cellos in the Stradivarian style, but with the individuality not to be simple replicas. He carefully examined the violins of Stradivari, using both the original diagrams and tools.

He received medals at Exhibitions in Europe and America.  

He enjoyed personal friendships with Royalty, patrons of art, and eminent virtuosi in Italy, France, Germany, and Russia, plus contributed articles to journals.

Teaching
Fiorini was a leading personality of the international violin-making world, and an innovator of the technical and aesthetic aspects of the profession. 

In 1920 he bought Antonio Stradivari's workshop templates, tools, original drawings and models from the Marchesa dalla Valle di Pomaro, an heir of the  Count Ignazio Alessandro Cozio di Salabue. He then donated the whole collection to the City of Cremona to found a lutherie school.

Fiorini is considered one of Italy's great masters of the 20th century.  He was one of the best of the violin makers in Italy at the beginning of the 20th century, and part of a renaissance of violin making in Italy which was nearly a lost art. 

Among his pupils were Ansaldo Poggi, Simone Fernando Sacconi, Carlo Carletti, Paolo Morara, Wolfgang Türcke-Bebié, Giuseppe Castagnino, Pietro Messori and Arrigo Tivoli-Fiorini.

Death
Fiorini died in Munich in 1934.

Honours
Fiorini was honoured with a knighthood (Cavaliere) in 1927.

References 

 
 
 Il Suono di Bologna, Da Raffaele Fiorini ai grandi maestri del Novecento. Catalogo della Mostra nella chiesa di San Giorgio in Poggiale, Bologna 2002. 
 Eric Blot, Un secolo di Liuteria Italiana 1860-1960 - A century of Italian Violin Making - Emilia e Romagna I, Cremona 1994. 
 
 Dictionary of 20th Century Italian Violin Makers Marlin Brinser 1978
 Regazzi Roberto, In occasione del 250º anniversario della morte di Antonio Stradivari per onorare la figura di Giuseppe Fiorini, Maestro Liutaio - Bazzano (Bologna) 1861 - Monaco di Baviera 1934. Una Immagine e una Biografia per celebrare la donazione della Collezione Salabue di Cimeli Stradivariani alla Città di Cremona, Bazzano 1987
 The Strad, January 1984 Bologna, a living tradition of Violin Making
 
 
 Walter Hamma, Meister Italienischer Geigenbaukunst, Wilhelmshaven 1993, 
 Dati Luigi, Nicolini Gualtiero, "Giuseppe Fiorini il fautore della rinascita della liuteria italiana". Nel 150esimo anniversario (1861-2011), Bologna-Cremona 2011.

External links 
 History
 Bolognese Violin Makers
 www.ilsuonodibologna.org

1861 births
1934 deaths
People from the Province of Bologna
Italian luthiers